The 1998–99 LEN Champions League was the 36th edition of LEN's premier competition for men's water polo clubs. It ran from  1998 to 5 June 1999, and it was contested by 16 teams. The Final Four (semifinals, final, and third place game) took place on June 4 and June 5 in Naples.

Preliminary round

Blue Group

Red Group

Final Four (Naples)

Final standings

See also
1998–99 LEN Cup Winners' Cup
1998–99 LEN Cup

LEN Champions League seasons
Champions League
1998 in water polo
1999 in water polo